Jule Niemeier (born 12 August 1999) is a German professional tennis player. She has a career-high WTA singles ranking of world No. 61, achieved on 7 November 2022.

Career

2018–2019: WTA debut
She made her WTA Tour main-draw debut as a wildcard at the 2018 Nürnberger Versicherungscup in doubles, partnering Lara Schmidt. She made her singles main-draw debut at the 2019 Nürnberger Versicherungscup, as a qualifier.

2021: Two WTA semifinals, top 150 debut
In 2021, Niemeier reached two semifinals on clay, in May at the Internationaux de Strasbourg as a qualifier, losing to the eventual champion Barbora Krejčíková, and in July at the Hamburg European Open as a wildcard, losing to Andrea Petkovic. As a result, she entered top 150 at world No. 140, on 12 July 2021.

On her Grand Slam qualifying competition debut at Wimbledon, she reached the third round losing to Lesley Pattinama Kerkhove.

2022: Top 100, first WTA 125 title, Grand Slam debut and quarterfinal
At the French Open, Niemeier qualified to make her Grand Slam main-draw debut.

She won her first WTA 125 tournament title at the Makarska International Championships.

Following her main-draw debut at the Wimbledon Championships, she reached her first Grand Slam quarterfinal after defeating Wang Xiyu, second seed Anett Kontaveit, Lesia Tsurenko and Heather Watson. The victory over Kontaveit was in straight sets and her first match against a top-10 player. In the quarterfinal, she lost to compatriot Tatjana Maria in three sets.

At her US Open main-draw debut, she reached the fourth round, after defeating Sofia Kenin, Yulia Putintseva, and Zheng Qinwen, all in straight sets. In the fourth round, she lost to world No. 1, Iga Świątek, after winning the first set.

Performance timelines

Only main-draw results in WTA Tour, Grand Slam tournaments, Fed Cup/Billie Jean King Cup and Olympic Games are included in win–loss records.

Singles
Current through the 2023 Indian Wells Open.

Doubles

WTA 125 tournament finals

Singles: 1 (title)

ITF Circuit finals

Singles: 6 (4 titles, 2 runner–ups)

Record against top-10 players
Niemeier's record against players who have been ranked in the top 10, with those who are active in boldface.

Wins over top-10 players
Niemeier has a  record against players who were, at the time the match was played, ranked in the top 10.

National teams participation

Billie Jean King Cup (2–2)

United Cup (0–2)

References

External links
 
 
 

1999 births
Living people
German female tennis players
Sportspeople from Dortmund
Tennis people from North Rhine-Westphalia